The 1944 West Virginia gubernatorial election took place on November 7, 1944, to elect the governor of West Virginia. Rush Holt Sr. unsuccessfully ran for the Democratic nomination.

Results

References

1944
gubernatorial
West Virginia
November 1944 events